An Gael is a quarterly literary magazine in the Irish language, published in the United States on behalf of the Philo-Celtic Society. It describes itself as international and was established in 2009 by Séamas Ó Neachtain, who is its editor. The magazine is based in New York City.

Its re-establishment in its present form coincided with the re-organization of the Society as a group devoted entirely to the promotion of the Irish language.

An Gael can be read online, and is available in printed form to subscribers.

References

External links 
 
 Philo-Celtic Society

Literary magazines published in the United States
Quarterly magazines published in the United States
Irish-language literature
Magazines established in 2009
Magazines published in New York City